The chemical compound isobutyl acetate, also known as 2-methylpropyl ethanoate (IUPAC name) or β-methylpropyl acetate, is a common solvent. It is produced from the esterification of isobutanol with acetic acid. It is used as a solvent for lacquer and nitrocellulose.  Like many esters it has a fruity or floral smell at low concentrations and occurs naturally in raspberries, pears and other plants.  At higher concentrations the odor can be unpleasant and may cause symptoms of central nervous system depression such as nausea, dizziness and headache. 

A common method for preparing isobutyl acetate is Fischer esterification, where precursors isobutyl alcohol and acetic acid are heated in the presence of a strong acid.

Isobutyl acetate has three isomers: n-butyl acetate, tert-butyl acetate, and sec-butyl acetate, which are also common solvents.

References

Flavors
Ester solvents
Acetate esters